The Cave is a student-led music and entertainment venue, located at Carleton College. It is a favorite gathering place for students at Carleton College and is one of a limited number of music venues in Northfield, Minnesota. Founded in 1927, it is the oldest student-run pub in America and is housed on the lowest level of the Margaret Evans residence hall.

The Cave has undergone many transformations over the decades: from lounge, to cabaret-style theater, to game room and finally, a music venue. The Cave stopped serving alcohol in 2013, although of-age students can bring their own alcohol.

The Cave is open Tuesday-Saturday for Carleton students during the academic term. There are typically several shows each week, most often on Friday and Saturday nights. A Carleton College ID card is usually required for entry, but there are sometimes shows that are open to the public.

Notable guests and performers 

The Cave has hosted a number of distinguished musicians, guests, and performers over the years.

Musicians 

 Angel Olsen
 Ani DiFranco
 Car Seat Headrest
 Caroline Smith
 Chairlift
 Dan Deacon
 Das Racist
 Doomtree
 Explosions in the Sky
 Frankie Cosmos
 Gear Daddies
 Guided by Voices
 Haley Bonar
 Haley Heynderickx
 Har Mar Superstar
 Indigo Girls
 Jens Lekman
 The Jesus Lizard
 Little Dragon
 Low
 Mal Blum
 Mark Mallman
 milo
 Phish
 Soul Asylum
 Tapes 'n Tapes
 Toro y Moi
 Wilco
 Wye Oak

Spoken word 
 Andrea Gibson
 Darkmatter
 Sarah Kay

References

External links
 The Cave official site
 The Cave archive
 The Cave's Facebook page
 Phish at the Cave

Music venues in Minnesota